Johannes Handl (born 7 May 1998) is an Austrian footballer who plays for Austria Wien.

References

Living people
1998 births
Association football defenders
Austrian footballers
SV Grödig players
SV Lafnitz players
FK Austria Wien players
Austrian Football Bundesliga players